Jeff Edler (born August 17, 1976) is the Iowa State Senator from the 26th District. A Republican, he has served in the Iowa Senate since defeating Democratic incumbent Steve Sodders in 2016. He is a resident of State Center, Iowa and is married to Stephanie with six children. Edler is a farmer and Consumers Energy Rural Electric Cooperative board president.

As of February 2020, Edler serves on the following committees: Local Government (Chair), Agriculture, Education, Human Resources, Veterans Affairs, and Ways and Means. He also serves on the Health and Human Services Appropriations Subcommittee (Vice Chair), as well as the International Relations Committee, the Children's Behavioral Health System State Board, Education Commission of the States, and the Mental Health and Disability Services Commission.

Electoral history

References 

Living people
1976 births
21st-century American politicians
Republican Party Iowa state senators